Alsea Bay is a body of water near Waldport, Oregon at the mouth of the Alsea River. It is a site for beach angling. It is spanned by the Alsea Bay Bridge and is in Lincoln County, Oregon.

References

External links
 Waldport, Alsea Bay, OR - US Harbors

Bodies of water of Lincoln County, Oregon